Choi Seung-Yong (Hangul: 최승용, born 6 February 1980) is a South Korean female speed skater. She competed at the 1998, 2002 and 2006 edition of Winter Olympics. She qualified for the Olympic in 1998, in which she placed both 24th in 500 m and 1000 m. She again qualified for the Olympics in 2002, and placed 18th in the 500 m and 32nd in the 1000 m. Her last Olympic ended up 18th in 500m.

Personal Records

External links
 Seung-Yong Choi at SpeedSkatingBase.eu
 
 

1980 births
Living people
South Korean female speed skaters
Olympic speed skaters of South Korea
Speed skaters at the 1998 Winter Olympics
Speed skaters at the 2002 Winter Olympics
Speed skaters at the 2006 Winter Olympics
Speed skaters at the 1999 Asian Winter Games
Speed skaters at the 2003 Asian Winter Games
Speed skaters at the 2007 Asian Winter Games
21st-century South Korean women